Ouango is a town located in the Central African Republic prefecture of Sangha-Mbaéré.

References

Populated places in Sangha-Mbaéré